Sven Gustav Erbs (March 20, 1911 – July 15, 1959) was a Swedish bobsledder who competed in the 1956 Winter Olympics.

Together with Kjell Holmström, Walter Aronson, and Jan Lapidoth he was a crew member of Sweden II who finished 13th in the four-man event.

Together with Walter Aronson he also competed in the two-man event but they were not able to finish.

External links
1956 bobsleigh four-man results
1956 bobsleigh two-man results

1911 births
1959 deaths
Swedish male bobsledders
Olympic bobsledders of Sweden
Bobsledders at the 1956 Winter Olympics
20th-century Swedish people